Billy Thurman Jackson (born September 13, 1959 in Phenix City, Alabama) is a former professional American football running back in the National Football League for the Kansas City Chiefs. He played college football at the University of Alabama.

See also
 Alabama Crimson Tide football yearly statistical leaders

External links
NFL.com player page

1959 births
Alabama Crimson Tide football players
American football running backs
Kansas City Chiefs players
Living people
People from Phenix City, Alabama
Players of American football from Alabama